Andrea Carolina Vargas Mena (born 28 May 1996) is a Costa Rican athlete specialising in the sprint hurdles. She is the current NR holder with the time of 12.64 seconds which was set at the IAAF World Championships in Doha 2019.  She represented her country at the 2018 World Indoor Championships without advancing from the first round.
She participated in the Panamerican Games in Lima, Peru, achieving first place in 100 meter hurdles. She competed at the 2020 Summer Olympics.

Her personal bests are 12.64 seconds in the 100 metres hurdles (Doha 2019) and 8.19 seconds in the 60 metres hurdles (Boston 2018).

International competitions

References

1996 births
Living people
Costa Rican female hurdlers
Central American and Caribbean Games gold medalists for Costa Rica
Competitors at the 2018 Central American and Caribbean Games
Central American Games gold medalists for Costa Rica
Central American Games medalists in athletics
Athletes (track and field) at the 2019 Pan American Games
Pan American Games gold medalists for Costa Rica
Pan American Games medalists in athletics (track and field)
Pan American Games gold medalists in athletics (track and field)
Central American and Caribbean Games medalists in athletics
Medalists at the 2019 Pan American Games
Ibero-American Championships in Athletics winners
Athletes (track and field) at the 2020 Summer Olympics
Olympic athletes of Costa Rica